Warren Henry "Bobby" Wheelock (August 6, 1864 – March 13, 1928) was an American shortstop in Major League Baseball who played for the Boston Beaneaters in 1887 and the Columbus Solons from 1890 to 1891. He batted right-handed and threw right-handed. His first game was on May 19, 1887, and his final game was on September 27, 1891. Wheelock was born on August 6, 1864, in Charlestown, Massachusetts, and died on March 13, 1928, in Boston, Massachusetts.

External links

1864 births
1928 deaths
19th-century baseball players
Major League Baseball shortstops
Boston Beaneaters players
Columbus Solons players
Portland (minor league baseball) players
Worcester Grays players
Detroit Wolverines (minor league) players
Elmira Gladiators players
Rochester Flour Cities players
Charleston Seagulls players
Wilkes-Barre Coal Barons players
Grand Rapids Rippers players
Grand Rapids Gold Bugs players
Columbus Buckeyes (minor league) players
Columbus Senators players
Grand Rapids Bob-o-links players
Des Moines Prohibitionists players
Norfolk Jewels players
New London Whalers players
Baseball players from Boston